Mercato Grove is a commercial development in Lake Oswego, Oregon. There are plans for six restaurants, as of 2021, including: Fills Donuts, Grassa, Lardo, Oven and Shaker, St. Jack, and Tasty.  Lac St. Jacks and Fills closed in 2022.

References

Lake Oswego, Oregon